Arthur Algernon Allison (January 29, 1849 – February 25, 1916) was an American Major League Baseball player from 1871 to 1876, who played his career primarily as an outfielder. He is known for playing in the first professional baseball game on May 4, 1871 between the Cleveland Forest Citys and the Fort Wayne Kekiongas, as Cleveland's Center Fielder.

Biography
Allison is also known as being the first ever strikeout recorded in major league history. Allison had a peak year during the 1873 season whilst playing for the Elizabeth Resolutes, where he had a career-high batting average of .320. Despite Allison having the second highest batting average of the 1873 season, the Resolutes as a team would place second to last in the National Association. After his baseball career, Arthur worked as a printer and resided in Washington D.C. for over 20 years until he died on February 25, 1916, after a fatal accident caused by colliding with a truck due to snowy weather while heading to work.

References 

Major League Baseball right fielders
Major League Baseball center fielders
Philadelphia Geary players
Cleveland Forest Citys (NABBP) players
Cleveland Forest Citys players
Elizabeth Resolutes players
Washington Nationals (NA) players
Hartford Dark Blues players
Louisville Grays players
19th-century baseball players
1849 births
1916 deaths
Binghamton Crickets (1870s) players
St. Paul Red Caps players
Baseball players from Pennsylvania